The 54th Assembly District of the Wisconsin is one of 99 districts in the Wisconsin State Assembly.  Located in east-central Wisconsin, the district covers most of the city of Oshkosh, Wisconsin, in eastern Winnebago County.  It also contains landmarks such as the University of Wisconsin–Oshkosh campus, the Oshkosh campus of the Fox Valley Technical College, and the Oshkosh Corporation headquarters. The district is represented by Democrat Lori Palmeri, since January 2023.

The 54th Assembly District is located within Wisconsin's 18th Senate district, along with the 52nd and 53rd Assembly districts.

History
The district was created in the 1972 redistricting act (1971 Wisc. Act 304) which first established the numbered district system, replacing the previous system which allocated districts to specific counties.  The 54th district was drawn mostly in line with the previous Dodge County 1st district, but exchanged towns in northern Dodge County for towns in western Washington County.  The last representative of the Dodge 1st district, Esther Doughty Luckhardt, went on to win the first election to represent the 54th Assembly district.  The boundaries of the 54th district have been mostly stable since the 1983 redistricting, comprising the city of Oshkosh and a shifting collection of wards from neighboring towns, but since 2002 has mostly been reduced to the city boundaries of Oshkosh.

List of past representatives

References 

Wisconsin State Assembly districts
Winnebago County, Wisconsin